A1one (pronounced  alone) is the pseudonym of Karan Reshad, an Iranian visual artist who pioneered graffiti and street art in Iran. His career as a street artist began in his hometown Tehran.

Life and career 
A1one grew up in Iran during a period of war and the Khatami reform era (1997–2005). A1one studied for 5 years at the Faculty of Art and Architecture in one of the Universities in Tehran. While still a student, he began painting graffiti on the walls of his campus, as a protest against students' conditions.  He was eventually expelled by the University's principal following a disagreement over religious restrictions.

After being expelled from the University, his graffiti activities in the city of Tehran increased. A1one was the first person to start painting on the city walls. Therefore, his name can be interpreted as "Alone" or "First One". A1one started painting walls in the late 1990s. He is the pioneer of the urban art scene in the Middle East. When he began, it was a time when nobody knew what graffiti was in his country. He had a very influential role in the rise of street art and stenciling within Iran.

Already involved in urban arts in general, he met the rapper, Nima, in 2005, who told him everything about the graffiti culture, which triggered A1one's desire to grow in that direction. His first significant work was a painting under the Tehran-Karaj expressway called Searching for Friends.

He started his street art project in 2003 and inspired his close friends at that time to also begin painting on the streets. Artists such as Elle, isba, K.T., and Magoi were the first people to join him in Tehran. With his public space art, he describes his view on Iranian society and puts himself regularly in danger.

"When I decided to do my painting on walls I bought some spray cans – at that time we had just some very low-quality colors in Iran. My first work was a very simple work titled "searching for friends" painted on a wall right next to the Tehran-Karaj expressway late at night. It was a frightening night for me… The next morning I got three calls from friends who recognized my style of painting. They were shocked to see my work on a public wall. My first stencil was a Munch's Scream Print on Art University walls and after that, experimented with many techniques and methods, but I continue with stencils, graffiti, and sticker art."

In 2007, he was invited to illustrate the cover of a book, Young and Defiant in Iran; a contemporary ethnographic work by Shahram Khosravi. In 2008, he was invited to show his work at the annual Melbourne Stencil Festival, taking 40 pieces of work with him to his first trip in a non-dictatorship country, thus experimenting exhibiting his artwork without the fear of reprisals for the first time.

By 2010, A1One was an established name within Tehran's youth culture and a key figure in the emergence of Iranian street art.

Style 

A1one's art world is dynamic and made of many different styles, from portraits to calligraphy and funky characters which he mostly uses for his stickers. A1one's art combines Persian calligraphy and Western graffiti. His art has been documented by many photographers and featured in Art Asia Pacific Magazine.

The artist has been working on a distinctly Iranian style of calligraffiti, which is "a fusion of hip-hop graffiti and Persian typography". His style is recognized across the Islamic graffiti world. He has made a handful of the greatest Style walls with Arabic letter graffiti since 2004.

Selected exhibitions

Group shows (selected) 
 2005 "Portrait and Expression", Behzad Art Gallery, Tehran, Iran
 2006 "Start Propaganda II", Los Angeles, USA
 2007 "Process Invisible", Street Level Gallery, Portland, USA
 2007 "Resist", La Condition Pablique, Roubaix, France
 2007 "Spray 2007", Mehrin Art Gallery, Tehran, IRAN
 2008 "Iranian Contemporary Artists Expo", Molavi Organization Hall, Tehran, IRAN
 2008 "Visual Slang", Henry Art Settlement, NY, USA
 2008 "400 ML", Paris, France
 2008 "Melbourne Stencil Festival 08", Yarra Sculpture Gallery, Melbourne, Australia
 2008 "Spray1387", Arete Gallery, Tehran, IRAN
 2008 12 Inch Art, Winnipeg Canada
 2008 Vinyl Killers, Portland, USA
 2009 Your Kid Can't Do this / Group show Touring Australia
 2009 Visual Slang III / New York
 2009 Urban Art Agenda / Melbourne / Brisbane, Australia
 2009 Brot And Kunst / Famous when Dead Gallery /Melbourne
 2009 Group Show  / Seyhoun Art  Gallery / Tehran
 2010 "Public Provocations", Carhartt Gallery – Weil am Rhein, Germany
 2015 " Urban Art Biennale 2015" , Voelklingen, Germany
 2017 Signs of the Time, Gold Coast City Gallery, Australia

Solo shows 
 2005  "Alone / Pain Things", Seyhoun Art Gallery, Tehran, IRAN
 2006  "October 1385", Mehrin Art Gallery, Tehran, IRAN
 2007  "I am Not Political" (private Solo show), Kolahstudio, Tehran, IRAN
 2008  "Spray it to the nation", Mehrin Art Gallery, Tehran, IRAN
 2010  Ishq, Mathgoth Galerie, Paris, France
 2010  Solo Show, Seyhoun Gallery, Tehran, IRAN
 2013  The First Sign, Mathgoth Galerie, Paris, France
 2019  From another world, S.F. Gallery, Essen, Germany

Publications 
 2002 Turn the Night / As Author and Translator / The most credible book about the story of Rock and heavy metal music in the Persian language /  / Mess Publications IRAN
 2007 Street Art and the War on Terror  / Rebellion Books/ UK
 2008 Young and Defiant in Tehran  /University of Pennsylvania Press (PENN)
 2008 Arabesque / Die Gestalten Verlag /  / Germany
 2008 Stencil Nation /  / ManicdPress USA
 2008 400 ml  / Kitchen93
 2009 Stickers2  / Die Gestalten verlag /Germany
 2009 The Ark   / Systems-Design Limited (IDN)/  HongKong
 2009 Urban IRAN  /Markbatty Publisher/USA
 2010 Street Knowledge by King Adz  Collins UK/Overlook Press (US)
 2011 Graffiti 365 by Jayson Eddin  Abrams (1 October 2011) (US)

See also 
Islamic graffiti
Tower 13

References

Further reading 
 Hamshahri /IRAN  Please Paint on our walls
 JUXTAPOZ ISSUE 97: FEBRUARY 2009 OUT NOW, Wednesday, 21 January 2009
 Underspray.org http://www.underspray.org/a1one.php
 Art Asia Pacific  No.65 / Oct 2009

External links 

 Artist's Website
 Video Interview With The Artist 2010 in Paris
 CANAL+ Interview With The Artist 2012 in Paris

Artists from Tehran
Iranian graffiti artists
Living people
Year of birth missing (living people)